Sactown Magazine is a bimonthly publication reporting on the cultural offerings of Sacramento, California. It began publication in December 2006. The magazine was founded by journalists Rob Turner and Elyssa Lee.

References

External links
Sactown home page

Bimonthly magazines published in the United States
Lifestyle magazines published in the United States
Local interest magazines published in the United States
City guides
Magazines established in 2006
Magazines published in California